Adele Marie Romanski (born November 10, 1982) is an American independent film producer. She is best known for producing the films Moonlight and The Myth of the American Sleepover. Moonlight received eight Oscar nominations at the 89th Academy Awards, winning Best Picture for the producers Romanski, Dede Gardner, and Jeremy Kleiner.

Personal life
Romanski grew up in Venice, Florida. She graduated from Pine View School in 2001, later graduating from Florida State University in 2004. She attended FSU with director Barry Jenkins.

She is married to Academy Award nominated cinematographer James Laxton, who has worked on several of the films she produced.

Career
In January 2017 it was announced Romanski would be an executive producer on season 2 of The Girlfriend Experience. She produced Under the Silver Lake, which was released in 2018. She was instrumental in instigating Barry Jenkins' sophomore feature, Moonlight, including getting him to decide on concepts, scouting locations and recommending Mahershala Ali for the role of Juan.  She won an Academy Award for Best Picture for producing her 2016 film Moonlight.

In addition to producing, Romanski has also written and directed the 2012 film Leave Me Like You Found Me.

In February 2018, she was selected to be on the jury for the main competition section of the 68th Berlin International Film Festival.

Filmography

Film

Television

References

External links

 

American women film producers
Golden Globe Award-winning producers
University of Florida alumni
Living people
Producers who won the Best Picture Academy Award
1982 births
Film producers from Florida
People from Sarasota, Florida
People from Venice, Florida
21st-century American women